Terence "Terry" Ryan (born 27 April 1942) is a former professional tennis player from South Africa.

Biography

Career
Born in Johannesburg, Ryan began touring in the 1960s. Ryan notably pushed Arthur Ashe to five sets when they met in second round of 1969 Wimbledon Championships. He won the first two sets, before the fifth seeded American came back to win and ultimately make the semi-finals. In 1971 he partnered with Zeljko Franulovic to make the fourth round of the men's doubles at the French Open, then teamed up with Jimmy Connors at that year's US Open and reached the third round. His best singles results on the Grand Prix circuit were quarter-final appearances at Eastbourne in 1971 and Newport, Wales in 1973.

Personal life
Ryan was the tournament director of the Dorado Beach WCT Tournament of Champions when it featured on the World Championship Tennis tour in 1979. He settled in Puerto Rico and worked as a head tennis coach at resorts in Dorado.

References

External links
 
 

1942 births
Living people
South African male tennis players
Tennis players from Johannesburg
South African expatriate sportspeople in Puerto Rico